Ayaz Niyazi oghlu Mutallibov (12 May 1938 – 27 March 2022) was an Azerbaijani politician who served as the first president of Azerbaijan. He was the last leader of Soviet Azerbaijan, and first President of Azerbaijan from 18 May 1990 until 6 March 1992 and from 14 May until 18 May 1992.

Biography

Ayaz Mutallibov was born on 12 May 1938, in Baku to the family of a physician and later World War II veteran, Niyazi Ashraf oghlu Mutallibov, and gynaecologist Kubra Mutallibova (died in 1988). Both of his parents were from Shamakhi.

In 1956, Ayaz Mutallibov graduated from the secondary school #189 in Baku. During his youth he was fond of jazz music. He was a member of the school volleyball team. In 1956–62, Mutallibov attended the Azerbaijan State Institute of Petroleum and Chemistry.

In 1964, he became the director of the Baku Refrigerator Factory, and in 1974, he was appointed the General Director of the "BakElectroBytMash" State Industrial Company.

Political career

1977 – appointed the Second Secretary of Azerbaijan Communist Party for Narimanov district of Baku.

1979 – appointed a Minister of Local Industry of Azerbaijan SSR.

1982 – appointed the Chairman of the State Planning Committee of Azerbaijan SSR and the Deputy Chairman of the Council of Ministers of Azerbaijan SSR.

January 1989 – appointed the Chairman of the Council of Ministers of Azerbaijan SSR.

20 January 1990 – Soviet troops enter Baku; Black January crackdown takes place.

24 January 1990 – While in Moscow, Mutallibov is appointed the First Secretary of the Azerbaijan Communist Party.

18 May 1990 – Supreme Council of Azerbaijan SSR elects Mutallibov as the first President of Azerbaijan SSR.

December 1990 – at Mutallibov's initiative, the Supreme Council of Azerbaijan SSR officially renames the country to Azerbaijan Republic and adopts the Declaration of Sovereignty.

17 March 1991 – under pressure from Mutallibov, the Supreme Council of Azerbaijan votes for participation of Azerbaijan in the referendum on the fate of the Soviet Union.

19 August 1991 – According to some reports, while on a visit to Tehran, Mutalibov made a statement about the Soviet coup attempt of 1991. However, in 2016, the ex-president of Azerbaijan said that he did not support the putschists.

30 August 1991 – Supreme Council of Azerbaijan adopts the Declaration of Independence of Azerbaijan.

14 September 1991 – Mutallibov dissolves the Communist Party of Azerbaijan and proposes constitutional changes for direct nationwide elections of president.

8 September 1991 – Mutallibov elected as president in a single-candidate nationwide election.

December 1991 – In a nationwide referendum, Azerbaijani voters approve the Declaration of Independence adopted by the Supreme Council; Soviet Union is dissolved, Azerbaijan is recognized as an independent state by Turkey, Israel, Romania and Pakistan.

25 February 1992 – Armenian forces with the support of Russia's 366th Motor Rifle Regiment took control of Khojaly; fleeing residents become victims of the Khojaly Massacre.

6 March 1992 – Under pressure from Azerbaijan Popular Front due to mismanagement in defense of Khojaly and safety of its inhabitants, Mutallibov was forced to submit his resignation to the National Assembly of Azerbaijan.

8 May 1992 – Armenian forces take control of Shusha, the last Azerbaijani-populated town in Nagorno-Karabakh.

14 May 1992 – Supreme Council of Azerbaijan, dominated by the former members of the Communist Party of Azerbaijan, hears the case on Khojaly Massacre, relieves Mutallibov of any responsibility, reverses his prior resignation and restores him as the President of Azerbaijan.

15 May 1992 – Armed forces led by the Azerbaijan Popular Front take control of the offices of the Parliament of Azerbaijan and Azerbaijani State Radio and Television, thereby deposing Mutallibov, who leaves for Moscow; defunct Supreme Council of Azerbaijan is dissolved passing the duties to the National Assembly of Azerbaijan formed by equal representation of Azerbaijan Popular Front and former communists.

17 May 1992 – Armenian forces take control of Lachin, Isa Gambar is elected as the new Chairman of the National Assembly of Azerbaijan and takes on the temporary duties of President of Azerbaijan until the national elections on 17 June 1992.

Exile

Mutallibov was in exile in Moscow from May 1992 until July 2012.

In 1994 he published a book called Karabakh – Black Garden in Moscow.

In April 2000, his followers in Baku declared the formation of the new Civil Union Party. In 2003 he joined the Azerbaijan Social Democratic Party (ASDP) and became its co-chairman in exile.

In July 2012, Mutallibov returned from exile with the permission of President Ilham Aliyev.

Family and personal life 

Mutallibov was married to Adila Mutallibova, who died in 2019. They had two sons, Azad and Zaur, grandson Tahir and granddaughter Madina. His son Azad died of cancer on 9 August 2011, leaving only Zaur. Mutallibov arrived in Baku to attend his son’s funeral. It was his first visit to the country after 1992.

See also

 President of Azerbaijan
 Politics of Azerbaijan
 National Assembly of Azerbaijan
 Foreign relations of Azerbaijan
 List of political parties in Azerbaijan

Notes

References

External links

Ayaz Mutallibov

1938 births
2022 deaths
Azerbaijani Muslims
Presidents of Azerbaijan
Azerbaijani exiles
Azerbaijani expatriates in Russia
Politburo of the Central Committee of the Communist Party of the Soviet Union members
Azerbaijan Communist Party (1920) politicians
Azerbaijani Social Democratic Party politicians
Soviet chemists
Azerbaijani chemists
Soviet politicians
Politicians from Baku
Heads of the government of the Azerbaijan Soviet Socialist Republic
Recipients of the Order of the Red Banner of Labour
Heads of state of the Azerbaijan Soviet Socialist Republic